Tošč is the highest hill in the Polhov Gradec Hills. The neighbouring hill Pasja Ravan used to be the highest before Yugoslav Army reduced its height by eight meters in the 1970s.

Name
Like nearby Toško Čelo, the name Tošč is ultimately derived from the Slovene adjective  'fat', referring to the mountain's wide base and gentle summit. No medieval transcriptions of the name are known, but it probably developed from a form such as *Tolstič 'the fat one'.

Routes
 1h from Selo 
 1h from Kmetija Gonte farm
 2½h from Polhov Gradec over Grmada
 2¼h from Topol over Grmada
 2h from Topol
 1¾h from Polhov Gradec through Mačkov Graben
 1¼h from Rovtar Farm
 1¾h from Mihelčič Lodge at Govejek
 1½h from Trnovec

References

External links

Tošč on Geopedia.si (maps, aerial photos)
Tošč on Hribi.net Routes and photos (slo)

Mountains of Upper Carniola
One-thousanders of Slovenia
Municipality of Škofja Loka